Samir Rafig ogly Nuriyev is an Azerbaijani politician who is the head of presidential administration (since 2019), was the chair of State Committee for City Building and Architecture (2018–2019), and the chair of the board of the State Housing Development Agency (2018), served as the chief of the Icherisheher State Historical-Architectural Reserve Department (2013–2016).

Biography
Nuriyev was born in Baku, Azerbaijan on March 9, 1975. He is married, with three children. He entered the Azerbaijan Technical University in 1991 and graduated from the School of Engineering and Management in 1996 with a degree in Engineering and Economics with honors. He continued his education at Duke University in the United States in 2003–2005 and received a master's degree in International Development Policy.

Career 
From 1996 to 2003, Nuriyev worked in various private companies and international organizations as an economist, marketing manager, and project coordinator. In 2000–2001 he worked as a Business Consultant at the UNDP Office in Azerbaijan.

In 2006 he was appointed the Director of the Department of Entrepreneurship Development at the Ministry of Economic Development of the Republic of Azerbaijan.

According to the relevant decrees of the President of the Republic of Azerbaijan, in 2009, Nuriyev was appointed a Deputy Chief of the Icherisheher State Historical-Architectural Reserve Department under the Cabinet of Ministers of the Republic of Azerbaijan, and in 2013 – Chief of the same Department.

Nuriyev was appointed the Director of the Board of the State Housing Development Agency under Presidential Decree dated April 12, 2016, the Chairman of State Committee for City Building and Architecture under decree dated April 21, 2018, and then the Head of Presidential Administration on November 1, 2019.

Social activity 
He is a member of the New Azerbaijan Party. Besides being a politician, Nuriyev is also an honorary member of the Union of Architects of Azerbaijan.

References 

1975 births
Living people
Politicians from Baku
New Azerbaijan Party politicians
Azerbaijan Technical University alumni
Duke University alumni